Dwight Anthony Pezzarossi García (born 4 September 1979) is a Guatemalan former professional football forward and assistant manager for Liga Nacional club Antigua. On 18 September 2014, Pezzarossi was named Minister of Culture and Sports of Guatemala.

Target man Pezzarossi, nicknamed El Tanque ("the Tank", due to his size), started his footballing career with Guatemalan lower division club Deportivo Escuintla. He spent one year there before signing for a club in the top Guatemalan league, Comunicaciones.

In 2000, Pezzarossi was signed by Argentinos Juniors and he became one of the few Guatemalan players to play abroad. Then, in June 2001, Pezzarossi moved to Chilean side Palestino.

Club career
Pezzarossi was born in Guatemala City, Guatemala. In 2003, he became the third Guatemalan footballer ever to sign with a Spanish club, joining Racing de Ferrol. He has played for a number of different clubs in different countries including Argentinos Juniors of Argentina, Palestino and Santiago Wanderers of Chile, and Bolton Wanderers of England. He played for Racing de Ferrol again in 2006, before being transferred to Numancia. He could not claim a regular place there and joined Deportivo Marquense in 2007.

In 2008, while playing for Marquense, he had a trial with Italian Serie B side Pisa Calcio.

La Serena
During the 2011 Copa América break, it was reported that Pezzarossi would join to Chilean Primera División side Deportes La Serena in a season deal. On 27 June, Pezzarossi arrived to Chile and then he joined to La Serena in a one-year contract. He debuted for La Serena in a 3–0 away loss against Universidad de Chile, playing only 23 minutes in the game after of replace to his teammate Juan Sánchez Sotelo. The following match, Pezzarossi scored in the 2–0 win of La Serena to Universidad de Concepción in the 88th minute, after an impressive header.

His good performance in La Serena made that Pezzarossi was recalled to the national team for the 2014 FIFA World Cup qualification match against Saint Vincent and the Grenadines, in where he scored in a 3–0 win of his country. After of his international participation, he scored for La Serena in a 2–0 win to Santiago Wanderers, a historic triumph of his team after 20 years of footballing paterny over La Serena at Valparaíso. His third goal for the club came against Unión Española in a dramatic 3–2 win, in where the keeper Marcos Gutiérrez saved the team of the draw, after of save a penalty to Leonardo Monje.

International career
Pezzarossi made his debut for Guatemala in a January 2000 friendly match against Panama and played his last match in 2012, he has earned a total of 72 caps, scoring 16 goals.
He has represented the Guatemalan team in four FIFA World Cup qualification campaigns of 2002, 2006, 2010 and 2014 . He remarkably only played two games at the CONCACAF Gold Cup, coming on as a substitute against El Salvador in 2007 and again as a substitute against Grenada in 2011.

Career statistics
Scores and results list Guatemala's goal tally first, score column indicates score after each Pezzarossi goal.

References

External links
 

1979 births
Living people
Sportspeople from Guatemala City
Guatemalan people of Italian descent
Guatemalan footballers
Guatemalan expatriate footballers
Guatemalan expatriate sportspeople in Spain
Guatemala international footballers
2001 UNCAF Nations Cup players
2005 CONCACAF Gold Cup players
2007 CONCACAF Gold Cup players
2011 CONCACAF Gold Cup players
Comunicaciones F.C. players
Argentinos Juniors footballers
Club Deportivo Palestino footballers
Deportes La Serena footballers
Santiago Wanderers footballers
Racing de Ferrol footballers
Bolton Wanderers F.C. players
CD Numancia players
Deportivo Marquense players
Chilean Primera División players
Argentine Primera División players
Guatemalan expatriate sportspeople in Chile
Expatriate footballers in Argentina
Expatriate footballers in Chile
Expatriate footballers in Spain
Expatriate footballers in Cyprus
Copa Centroamericana-winning players
Association football forwards
Guatemalan sportsperson-politicians
Culture ministers of Guatemala
Sports ministers of Guatemala